Bill Austin (c. 1937 – 2015) was an American college football and college lacrosse player. He played as a back for the Rutgers Scarlet Knights football team from 1956 to 1958 and was selected by the Associated Press as a first-team player on the 1958 All-America Team. He finished sixth in the voting for the Heisman Trophy in 1958, and he rushed for 2,073 yards and scored 204 points during his college football career at Rutgers. Austin also played lacrosse at Rutgers, earning honorable mention All-American accolades in 1958 and 1959.

A resident of Camarillo, California who spent most of his professional career as an executive of a number of bicycle manufacturers, Austin grew up in Fanwood, New Jersey and played football at Scotch Plains-Fanwood High School, graduating in 1955.

References

Year of birth uncertain
1930s births
2015 deaths
American football fullbacks
Rutgers Scarlet Knights football players
Rutgers Scarlet Knights men's lacrosse players
Scotch Plains-Fanwood High School alumni
People from Camarillo, California
People from Fanwood, New Jersey
Sportspeople from Union County, New Jersey
Sportspeople from Ventura County, California
Players of American football from New Jersey
Lacrosse players from New Jersey